Asquith Girls High School, (abbreviated as AGHS) is a government-funded comprehensive single-sex secondary day school for girls, located on Stokes Avenue, Asquith, an upper north shore suburb of Sydney, New South Wales, Australia.

Established in 1959 to replace the Hornsby Home Science School, the school enrolled approximately 820 students in 2018, from Year 7 to Year 12, of whom one percent identified as Indigenous Australians and 32 percent were from a language background other than English. The school is operated by the NSW Department of Education in accordance with a curriculum developed by the New South Wales Education Standards Authority; the principal is Elizabeth Amvrazis.

The school's brother school is the Asquith Boys High School.

History
In February 1958, the NSW Department of Education acquired a  site in eastern Asquith for a new girls high school to replace the Hornsby Home Science School (established 1947) that was destroyed with other school buildings on Peats Ferry Road in a bushfire in 1957. Asquith Girls High School officially commenced operation from 1 January 1959.

Principals 
The following individuals have served as principal of Asquith Girls High School:

Notable alumnae
 Margaret Braakensiekmedical professional (Dux 1964)
 Micky Greenpop singer

See also 

 List of government schools in New South Wales
 Education in Australia

References

Further reading

External links 
 
 NSW Department of Education School Finder – Asquith Girls High School
 Asquith Girls High School P&C website

Educational institutions established in 1947
1947 establishments in Australia
Educational institutions disestablished in 1958
1958 disestablishments in Australia
Educational institutions established in 1959
1959 establishments in Australia
Girls' schools in New South Wales
Public high schools in Sydney
Asquith, New South Wales